Hala Yalda Jarbou (born 1971) is the Chief United States district judge of the United States District Court for the Western District of Michigan. She is the first Chaldean federal judge.

Education 

Jarbou earned her Bachelor of Business Administration from the University of Michigan–Dearborn, with high distinction, and her Juris Doctor from the Wayne State University Law School.

Career 

After graduating from law school, Jarbou served as an assistant prosecuting attorney in the Oakland County Prosecutor's Office, where she prosecuted general felony offenses, homicides, child sexual assault, and high-profile felony cases. In 2010, she became an Assistant United States Attorney for the Eastern District of Michigan, where she prosecuted cases involving drug and firearms offenses, child pornography, and high-level drug trafficking. She was an associate professor of the Paralegal Program at Oakland University from April–July 2005.

State judicial service 

On October 20, 2015, Jarbou was appointed to the 6th Circuit Court of Michigan by Governor Rick Snyder to the vacancy left by Judge Colleen O'Brien, who was appointed to the Michigan Court of Appeals. She was sworn in on January 20, 2016. Her service on the state court terminated when she received her judicial commission as a federal judge.

Federal judicial service 

On March 11, 2020, President Donald Trump announced his intent to nominate Jarbou to serve as a United States district judge of the United States District Court for the Western District of Michigan. On March 18, 2020, her nomination was sent to the Senate. President Trump nominated Jarbou to the seat vacated by Judge Robert Holmes Bell, who assumed senior status on January 31, 2017. A hearing on her nomination before the Senate Judiciary Committee was held on June 24, 2020. On July 30, 2020, her nomination was reported out of committee by a 18–4 vote. On September 9, 2020, the United States Senate invoked cloture on her nomination by an 80–15 vote. On September 10, 2020, her nomination was confirmed by an 83–15 vote. She received her judicial commission on September 23, 2020. She became chief judge on July 18, 2022.

Memberships 

Jarbou is a member of the following:

 State Bar of Michigan, 1997–present
 Michigan Judges Association, 2015–present
 Federal Bar Association (Detroit chapter), 2010–present
 Oakland County Bar Association, 2015–present
 Federalist Society, 2011–present

Personal life 

Jarbou was born in 1971 in Tel Keppe (Tel Kaif), Iraq and now resides in West Bloomfield. She is an ethnic  Assyrian and belongs to the Chaldean Catholic denomination.

References

External links 
 
 

|-

1971 births
Living people
20th-century American women lawyers
20th-century American lawyers
21st-century American women lawyers
21st-century American lawyers
21st-century American judges
21st-century American women judges
American Chaldeans
American prosecutors
Assistant United States Attorneys
Federalist Society members
Judges of the United States District Court for the Western District of Michigan
Michigan lawyers
Michigan Republicans
Michigan state court judges
People from Tel Keppe
University of Michigan–Dearborn alumni
State attorneys
United States district court judges appointed by Donald Trump
Wayne State University Law School alumni
Iraqi emigrants to the United States
Chaldean Americans